Roger John Kemp  is a professorial fellow in engineering at Lancaster University. He was engineering manager for the Docklands Light Railway in London and managed the design and development team at Eurostar.

References

External links 
Lancaster University – Roger Kemp
Lancaster University researchdirectory – Professor Roger Kemp MBE BSc FREng CEng FIET

Living people
Academics of Lancaster University
Members of the Order of the British Empire
Alumni of the University of Sussex
English railway mechanical engineers
Fellows of the Royal Academy of Engineering
Year of birth missing (living people)